Anusree  (born 24 October 1990) is an Indian actress who appears in Malayalam films. She made her acting debut in the 2012 film Diamond Necklace and has acted in a number of Malayalam films in female lead roles.

Early life  
Anusree was born on 24 October 1990 in Kerala, to father Muraleedharan Pillai, a clerk at the Kerala Water Authority, and mother Shobhana, a housewife. She was brought up in Kamukumchery, Kollam district. She has an elder brother, Anoop. She went to Indira Gandhi Memorial Vocational Higher Secondary School, Manjakala, Kollam. Her passion for acting started from her school days.

Career
Anusree impressed director Lal Jose while he was judging the acting reality show Vivel Active Fair Big Break on Surya TV, in which she was competing, leading to her film debut as Kalamandalam Rajasree in Lal Jose's 2012 film Diamond Necklace. She then appeared in Left Right Left (2013), Pullipulikalum Aattinkuttiyum (2013), and Angry Babies in Love (2014). She had lead roles in the films Ithihasa (2014) and My Life Partner  (2014). She was nominated for the Filmfare Award for Best Actress for her role as Sushama in Chandrettan Evideya  (2015). In 2016 she appeared in Dileesh Pothan's  Maheshinte Prathikaaram and as Police ACP Ganga in Priyadarshan's  Oppam. She went on to star in films such as Kochavva Paulo Ayyappa Coelho (2016), Oru Cinemakkaran (2017),  Aadhi (2018), and Panchavarnathatha (2018).

Anusree was initially cast in the female lead role in Pulimurugan (2016), opposite to Mohanlal. Due to poor health she was unable to appear in the film. She later worked with Mohanlal in Priyadarshan's  Oppam (2016). She also acted in Madhura Raja (2019) opposite to Mammootty.

Filmography

Film

Awards

References

External links
 
 

1990 births
21st-century Indian actresses
Living people
Actresses from Kollam
Actresses in Malayalam cinema
Indian film actresses
People from Kollam district
Actresses in Malayalam television
Indian television actresses